Hulda Hoehn Crooks (May 19, 1896 – November 23, 1997) was an American mountaineer. Affectionately known as "Grandma Whitney" she successfully scaled  Mount Whitney 23 times between the ages of 65 and 91. She had climbed 97 other peaks during this period.
In 1990, an Act of Congress renamed Day Needle, one of the peaks in the Whitney area, to Crooks Peak in her honor.

Hulda Hoehn was born in Saskatchewan, Canada, one of 18 children of a farming couple. She left the farm just before she turned eighteen and enrolled at Pacific Union College north of San Francisco and later at Loma Linda University. There she met and married Dr Crooks. She took up climbing in 1950, after the death of her husband as he had encouraged her to start after she suffered a bout of pneumonia.

On July 24, 1987, at the age of 91, she became the oldest woman to complete the ascent of Mount Fuji in Japan. She hiked the entire 212 mile John Muir Trail in the high Sierras, completing the hike in segments over five years.

Hulda Crooks was a long-time resident of Loma Linda, California and a Seventh-day Adventist. She often spent time with children in the community, encouraging them to appreciate nature and stay active. In 1991 Loma Linda dedicated a park at the base of the south hills as Hulda Crooks Park.

According to Congressman Jerry Lewis (R California), one of her hiking companions,

Crooks died in 1997, aged 101.

References

External links 
 A personal webpage by friends of Crooks
 The Backpacking Octogenarian Health and Fitness
 Hiking report at Hulda Crooks Park includes 3D maps of terrain.
 Photo of Jerry Lewis with Hulda Crooks below Whitney Summit.

1896 births
1997 deaths
American mountain climbers
American centenarians
Female climbers
American sportswomen
People from Loma Linda, California
Women centenarians
20th-century American women
20th-century American people
Hikers